Q99 may refer to:

Radio stations 
 CIKT-FM, in Grand Prairie, Alberta
 WSLQ, in Roanoke, Virginia
 WWWQ, in Atlanta, Georgia

Other uses 
 Q99 (New York City bus)
 Al-Zalzalah, the 99th surah of the Quran
 
 San Martin Airport, in Santa Clara County, California, United States